The Malta Financial Services Authority (MFSA) is a financial regulator of Malta. The MFSA was founded in 2002 when it assumed the responsibilities of the Central Bank of Malta, the Malta Stock Exchange, and the Malta Financial Services Centre. It regulates banking, investment, insurance, financial, pension companies and securities markets in Malta.

Powers
The MFSA has the powers to regulate, monitor, and supervise the financial sector of Malta, protecting the interests of the consumers and promoting the market transparency and efficiency. It has the powers to review business practices, advise the government on policies, and to investigate potential harmful and unfair practices in the financial industry.

International relations
The MFSA is a member of the European Banking Authority, the European Insurance and Occupational Pensions Authority, the European Securities and Markets Authority, the International Organization of Securities Commissions, and the International Association of Insurance Supervisors.

Demerger 
The MFSA was demerged from the Registry of Companies in 2018 in order to focus on its regulatory role and duties. The Registry of Companies is now a stand-alone agency and is now known as the Malta Business Registry (MBR).

Notable cases and controversies

In June 2016, the MFSA drew criticism from the MEP Sven Giegold for poor regulatory supervision of the Maltese financial institutions.

In 2018, Joseph Cuschieri was appointed as CEO of the Malta Financial Services Authority. He started his position accompanied by his close friend Edwina Licari, and during their time at the MFSA, they had more than 35 “business trips” together, where €0.5 million from taxpayers’ money were spent.  In 2020, Joseph Cuschieri decided to resign from the role due to the revelations of his closeness with Yorgen Fenech, the main suspect behind the assassination of Daphne Caruana. Edwina Licari still works at MFSA as a General Counsel with a high annual salary of €100,000.

In March 2018, the MFSA took control of Pilatus Bank, a Maltese bank headed by Ali Sadr Hasheminejad, whose money laundering scheme of sanctioned Iranian money was exposed by late Daphne Caruana Galizia. Later, in June, the MFSA asked the European Central Bank to withdraw Pilatus Bank's licence. In July of the same year, Pilatus Bank's depositors threatened to sue the MFSA for freezing €80 million in funds held by innocent victims. In October, the bank's directors followed with their own lawsuit to the MFSA. In November 2018, the bank's European licence has been withdrawn by the ECB.

In October 2018, the MFSA froze the assets of SataBank due to anti-money laundering concerns. The freeze resulted in vocal criticism of the bank's account holders. The bank is co-owned by Christo Georgiev, the owner of LeoPay startup.

In August 2019, the Malta Financial Services Authority became embroiled in scandal after paying €150,000 severance to its human resources department director, George Spiteri, who later was rehired for a similar position by the Malta Business Registry, which branched out of the MFSA just a few weeks earlier.

References

External links
 

2002 establishments in Malta
Government agencies established in 2002
Financial regulatory authorities of Malta